Located in Tirupati, Andhra Pradesh, India, Sree Vidyanikethan College of Nursing (SVCN) focuses solely on health and medical sciences. Established in 2006, SVCN offers Bachelor of Science degree programs as well as post-graduate programs in nursing, including masters. SVCN has been approved by AP Nursing Council and affiliated to Dr. NTR University of Health Sciences, Vijayawada. It is recognized by Indian Nursing Council, New Delhi. Instituted by Sree Vidyanikethan Educational Trust(SVET).

References

External links 

 Official website

Colleges in Andhra Pradesh
Universities and colleges in Tirupati
Nursing schools in India
2006 establishments in Andhra Pradesh
Educational institutions established in 2006